Year 254 (CCLIV) was a common year starting on Sunday (link will display the full calendar) of the Julian calendar. At the time, it was known as the Year of the Consulship of Valerianus and Gallienus (or, less frequently, year 1007 Ab urbe condita). The denomination 254 for this year has been used since the early medieval period, when the Anno Domini calendar era became the prevalent method in Europe for naming years.

Events

By place

Roman Empire 
 Publius Licinius Valerianus Augustus and Publius Licinius Egnatius Gallienus become Roman Consuls.
 The Roman Empire is threatened by several peoples on their borders: the Germanic confederations, such as the Franks on the Middle Rhine, the Alemanni on the upper Rhine and Danube, and the Marcomanni facing the provinces at Noricum and Raetia. On land the confederation of Goths threaten the lower Danube provinces, and on the sea they threaten the shores of Thracia, Bithynia et Pontus, and Cappadocia. In the eastern provinces, the Sassanid Persians had the previous year defeated a Roman field army at Barballisos, and afterwards plundered the defenseless provinces. This period of time is called today the Crisis of the Third Century.

By topic

Religion 
 May 12 – Pope Stephen I succeeds Pope Lucius I.
</onlyinclude>

Deaths 
 March 5 – Lucius I, bishop of Rome
 Li Feng (or Anguo), Chinese official and politician
 Tiberius Julius Pharsanzes, Roman client king
 Xiahou Xuan (or Taichu), Chinese general and politician (b. 209)
 Zhang Ni (or Boqi), Chinese general, official and politician

References